The men's 53.4 kilometres individual time trial competition at the 2010 Asian Games was held on 20 November.

Schedule
All times are China Standard Time (UTC+08:00)

Results

References

External links 
Results

Road Men ITT